Alfred Franklin Kenning (June 3, 1885 – October 22, 1938) was a lumberman and political figure in Ontario. He represented Cochrane South in the Legislative Assembly of Ontario from 1926 to 1934 as a Conservative member.

He was born in Pembroke, Ontario, the son of Richard W. Kenning and Charlotte Gibson, and was educated there. Kenning served in the Canadian Machine Gun Corps and the British infantry during World War I, reaching the rank of lieutenant. In 1921, he married Craig Hoggarth. He died at his home in 1938 after a brief illness.

References

External links

1885 births
Progressive Conservative Party of Ontario MPPs
1938 deaths
Canadian Expeditionary Force officers
British Army personnel of World War I
British Army officers
Canadian military personnel from Ontario
Canadian military personnel of World War I
Canadian Machine Gun Corps officers